The Montenero Circuit, official name: Circuito del Montenero or sometimes referred to simply as "the Livorno Circuit", was a Grand Prix motor racing road course located at the southern outskirts of Livorno, a city on the mediterranean coast of the Tuscany region in Italy. The venue was best known as the home for the annual Circuito Montenero - Coppa Ciano and the 1937 Italian Grand Prix.

History 
The circuit was created in 1921 at the initiative of Paolo Fabbrini, owner of the newspaper Corriere di Livorno to host local sports car races. On September 25 the same year, the first "Coppa Montenero" was held on an 18.5 km long public roads circuit with 164 corners, starting at the seafront "Rotonda" (Parco Bartolini) in the Ardenza district of Livorno, stretching up into the hills of Montenero, climbing to about 300 meters above sea level before returning down to the start/finish line. The circuit was long, with dangerous sections and extremely hard on both man and machine but considered a huge success, attracting interest from regional motoring clubs and the automobile industry alike.

In 1927, Livorno-born politician Costanzo Ciano donated the first "Coppa Ciano" trophy, starting one of the most prestigious Grand Prix racing series to endure for the next 12 years. Like many other circuits of the era, Montenero had to change its layout several times over the years to accommodate the growing demands of racing technology. The last major Circuito Montenero - Coppa Ciano Grand Prix in 1939 also marks the end of the great road course era. Safety concerns, increasingly unmanageable circuit demands, faster cars among other factors left shorter, purpose-built race tracks as the only viable alternative for future Grand Prix venues. One last "Coppa Montenero" was held in 1947 in an attempt to revive the circuit but proved to be financially unsuccessful. A minor sports car race in 1953 was the last event before the track was closed down for good.

List of events

(*) The mountain section of the circuit was dropped from 1936 to 1947

Circuito Montenero by year

Montenero circuit maps

Notes
 Circuit data for 'Fast Lap' (if available) is inconsistent.
 Times given are for the completed race.
 Fastest drivers for the major circuit variants are determined by median speed average
 Race (event) numbering is adopted from "Circuito del Montenero Coppa Ciano" (Italian)
Inconsistencies and discrepancies in Grand Prix era race numbering were often due to political conflicts between regional municipalities and national sanctioning bodies. (example: Grand Prix de la Marne vs Grand Prix de Reims vs Grand Prix de l'ACF

References

External links
 Circuito del Montenero - Coppa Ciano (Italian)
 The Golden Era of Grand Prix Racing 
 AIACR European Driver Championships 1931,1932, 1935-1939
 Formula One WC and non-championship results The Formula One Archives
 A forgotten Championship when Nuvolari waved the steering wheel at the crowd...

Montenero
Montenero
Italian Grand Prix
Livorno